The SS Lurline was the third Matson Lines vessel to hold that name and the last of four fast and luxurious ocean liners that Matson built for the Hawaii and Australasia runs from the West Coast of the United States. Lurline served as a troopship in World War II operated by War Shipping Administration agents serving Army troop transport requirements. Bought by the Chandris Lines in 1963 as the RHMS Ellinis the ship became one of the most important luxury cruise ships on the Australian and New Zealand services. She operated in Australasia and Oceania until 1980. The sister ships of the SS Lurline were the SS Palo Alto and SS Oakland.

History

As Lurline (1932)

SS Lurline was christened on 12 July 1932 in Quincy, Massachusetts, by Lurline Matson Roth for the Matson Lines' Pacific services. Lurline was the last of the four American-built Matson "White Fleet" liners designed by William Francis Gibbs; Roth, the daughter of the Matson Lines' founder, previously had christened a namesake 1908 steamship Lurline as a young woman of 18. On 12 January 1933, SS Lurline left New York City bound for San Francisco via the Panama Canal on her maiden voyage, thence to Sydney and the South Seas, returning to San Francisco on 24 April 1933. She then served on the express San Francisco to Honolulu service with her sister "White Fleet" ship Malolo.

Aviator Amelia Earhart was carried by Lurline from Los Angeles to Honolulu with her Lockheed Vega airplane secured on deck during December 22–27, 1934. The voyage prepared her for the record-breaking Honolulu-to-Oakland solo flight she made in January 1935.

Lurline was halfway from Honolulu to San Francisco on 7 December 1941, carrying a record load of 765 passengers, when the Japanese bombed Pearl Harbor. The ship's alleged reception of radio signals from the Japanese fleet became part of the Pearl Harbor advance-knowledge conspiracy theory.

She spent the war providing similar services, often voyaging to Australia, and once transported Australian Prime Minister John Curtin to America to confer with President Roosevelt. Wartime events put Lurline at risk. Royal Australian Air Force trainee pilot Arthur Harrison had been put on watch without adequate training. "A straight line of bubbles extending from away out on the starboard side of the ship to across the bow. I had never seen anything quite like it, but it reminded me of bubbles behind a motorboat. I called to the lad on watch on the next gun forward. A few seconds later the ship went into a hard 90° turn to port. We RAAF trainees received a severe reprimand from the captain for not reporting the torpedo. Anyway, it was a bad miss."

Lurline was returned to Matson Lines in mid-1946 and extensively refitted at Bethlehem-Alameda Shipyard in Alameda, California, in 1947 at a cost exceeding US$18 million, with accommodations designed by Raymond Loewy for 484 first-class and 238 cabin-class passengers, served by a crew of 444. She resumed her San Francisco–Los Angeles–Honolulu service from 15 April 1948, calling at Los Angeles on April 16 and arriving at Honolulu on April 21.

Her high occupancy rates during the early 1950s caused Matson to also refit her sister ship Monterey (renaming her SS Matsonia) and the two liners provided a first-class-only service between Hawaii and the American mainland from June 1957 to September 1962, mixed with the occasional Pacific cruise. Serious competition from jet airliners caused passenger loads to fall in the early 1960s and Matsonia was laid up in late 1962.

Only a few months later, Lurline arrived in Los Angeles with serious engine trouble in her port turbine, and was laid up, with the required repairs considered too expensive. Matson instead brought the Matsonia out of retirement, and characteristically, changed her name to Lurline.  The original Lurline was sold to Chandris Lines in 1963.

As Ellinis of the Chandris Line

Lurline was bought by Chandris Lines in September 1963 to replace SS Brittany, wrecked by fire earlier in the year. Ellinis sailed under her new name from California to North East England for repairs in North Shields, and was refitted with increased accommodation for 1,668 passengers in one class.

She was given new Chandris livery and a modernised superstructure with new funnels, and embarked on her maiden voyage from Piraeus to Sydney on 30 December 1963. Her homeward voyages were alternately routed east via the Panama Canal to Southampton. The ship took occasional cruises.

In 1973, English musician David Bowie wrote his song "Aladdin Sane" from his album of the same name whilst on board. This can be seen by the annotation in the vinyl pressings of the album.

In April 1974, cruising to Japan, Ellinis developed major problems in one engine. Fortunately, Chandris were able to buy a surplus engine from her sister ship Homeric (ex-Mariposa), which was being broken up in Taiwan at the time. The replacement was carried out in Rotterdam, finishing in March 1975.

Ellinis provided mainly cruise services from 1975, and in October 1981, she was finally laid up in Greece after providing passenger services for nearly fifty years. Despite various plans to use the ship whole, she was sold in 1986 and scrapped in Taiwan in 1987. Some of her fittings were installed in other Chandris ships; her engine parts were stored against future need by her aging sister Britanis (ex-Monterey).

Elliniss radio callsign was SWXX and two of her known QSS ("working frequencies") were 8343 and 12508 kHz.

Other ships named Lurline of the Matson Line

Lurline (1887)
William Matson had first come to appreciate the name in the 1870s while serving as skipper aboard the Claus Spreckels family yacht Lurline (a poetic variation of Lorelei, the Rhine River siren) out of San Francisco Bay. Matson met his future wife, Lillie Low, on a yacht voyage he captained to Hawaii; the couple named their daughter Lurline Berenice Matson. Spreckels sold a 150-foot brigantine named Lurline to Matson so Matson could replace his smaller schooner Emma Claudina and double the shipping operation, which involved hauling supplies and a few passengers to Hawaii and returning with cargos of Spreckels sugar. Matson added other vessels to his nascent fleet and the brigantine was sold to another company in 1896.

Lurline (1908)
Matson built a steamship named Lurline in 1908; one which carried mainly freight, yet could hold 51 passengers along with 65 crew. This steamer served Matson for 20 years, including a stint with United States Shipping Board during World War I. Matson died in 1917; his company continued under a board of directors.

Lurline Matson married William P. Roth in 1914; in 1927, Roth became president of Matson Lines. That same year had  (Hawaiian for "flying fish") enter service inaugurating a higher class of tourist travel to Hawaii. In 1928, Roth sold the old steamship Lurline to the Alaska Packers' Association. That ship served various duties including immigration and freight under the Yugoslavian flag (renamed Radnik) and was finally broken up in 1953.

Lurline (1963, ex-Matsonia, ex-Monterey)

The sister liner originally christened  (1931) first was renamed Matsonia (1956) and then Lurline (1963), replacing her sister ships of the same names for the Matson Line as they were retired from service. Lurline (1963) was eventually sold to Chandris Lines in 1970 and was renamed Britanis, where she served Caribbean routes until 1994; after a brief stint as a floating barracks in Guantanamo Bay, Cuba, she was sold again in 1998 and renamed Belofin-1. While under tow en route to a scrapyard in India, she capsized and sank in 2000 off the coast of South Africa.

See also 
 SS Manoa (1913)

References

Further reading

External links 
 Maritime Matters: Lurline, Ellinis
 ssMaritime with Reuben Goossens. Matson / Chandris Lines SS Lurline / RHMS Ellinis
 whiteships.com

Ocean liners
1932 ships
Cruise ships of the United States
Ships built in Quincy, Massachusetts
Troop ships of the War Shipping Administration
Maritime incidents in 1971